During the parade of nations portion of the 1980 Summer Olympics opening ceremony, athletes from each country participating in the Olympics paraded in the arena, preceded by their flag. The flag was borne by a sportsperson from that country chosen either by the National Olympic Committee or by the athletes themselves to represent their country.

Parade order
As the nation of the first modern Olympic Games, Greece entered the stadium first; whereas, the host nation Soviet Union marched last, in accordance with the tradition and IOC guidelines. As each delegation entered accompanied by the Soviet march music, the national name was announced in Russian.

Eighty nations entered the stadium with a combined total of 5,179 athletes, the smallest since 1956. Seven of them made their Olympic debut, namely Angola, Botswana, Cyprus, Jordan, Laos, Mozambique and Seychelles. 

In partial support of the United States boycott, sixteen countries marched into the Olympic stadium under the Olympic flag. Seven of them, however, did not attend the opening ceremonies, their flags were instead carried by Moscow Olympic Committee volunteers. Two other countries (Great Britain and Ireland) paraded into the Stadium only with their officials, while four of them participated under the Olympic flag with their athletes. New Zealand, Portugal, and Spain, on the other hand, participated in the Games under their NOC flags.

List
The following is a list of each country's announced flag bearer. The list is sorted by the order in which each nation appears in the parade of nations. The names are given in their official designations by the IOC.

This table is sortable by country name (in Russian), the flag bearer's name, and the flag bearer's sport.

Notes

References

Links 
 Flagbearers for 1980 Summer Olympics

 
Lists of Olympic flag bearers